The three red lines (Chinese: 三條紅線, Simplified: 三条红线, Pinyin: sān tiáo hóng xiàn) are financial regulatory guidelines in China introduced in August 2020 relating to the ratio of debt to cash, equity and assets. It was introduced to help rein in the highly indebted property-development sector in China, seen especially in large real estate concerns such as Evergrande, which faced a liquidity crisis in Q4 2021.

History 
The three red lines were introduced in August 2020. They stated property should adhere to the following rules:

 Liabilities should not exceed 70 percent of assets (excluding advance proceeds from projects sold on contract)

 Net debt should not be greater than 100 percent equity.
 Money reserves must be at least 100 percent of short term debt.

In March, the CBRC, the central bank and the Ministry of Housing and Construction and other regulatory agencies jointly issued a document requiring the prevention of irregular flow of loans for business purposes into the real estate sector, and the officials of the Ministry of Housing and Construction even personally went to localities to inspect the real estate situation.

Since December 2021, borrowing to finance acquisitions and mergers would not be included in red line metrics. This was to help facilitate financially healthier firms to buy assets from indebted companies.

References 

Financial regulation in China
2020 in China
2020s economic history